Thomaz Soares da Silva, also known as Zizinho (14 September 1921 – 8 February 2002), was a Brazilian footballer who played as an attacking midfielder for the Brazil national football team. He came to international prominence at the 1950 World Cup, where he scored two goals. He was lauded as a complete player, with an array of offensive skills such as his dribbling, passing, and shooting ability with both feet, as well as his accuracy from dead ball situations and extraordinary vision. He was Pelé's idol, and is often considered one of the best Brazilian footballers of the pre-Pelé era.

Career
Born at Niterói, Rio de Janeiro, he played for Flamengo, Bangu, São Paulo FC, Audax Italiano of Chile among others teams. He is considered the first idol of Flamengo, club that he defended - winning the state championships in 1942, 1943 and 1944 - until he was transferred just before the start of 1950 World Cup to Bangu. In São Paulo he won the state championship in 1957 being extremely important and becoming an idol.

In the 1950 World Cup he helped Brazil to progress to the final, but their surprise 2–1 defeat to Uruguay tarnished his reputation. Zizinho played a total of 53 times for his national team, scoring 30 goals. He turned down last minute invitations by the CBF to join first the 1954 World Cup Squad and then the 1958 squad, citing on both occasions that it would be unfair on the player being dropped at the last minute to make way for him.

Pelé always said that Zizinho was the best player he ever saw. "He was a complete player. He played in midfield, in attack, he scored goals, he could mark, head and cross."

Honours

Club
Campeonato Carioca: 1942, 1943, 1944
Campeonato Paulista: 1957

International
FIFA World Cup runner-up: 1950
South American Championship: 1949
Taça do Atlântico: 1956
Roca Cup: 1945
Copa Rio Branco: 1950
Taça Oswaldo Cruz: 1955, 1956

Individual
FIFA World Cup Golden Ball: 1950
FIFA World Cup All-Star Team: 1950
IFFHS Brazilian Player of the 20th Century (4th place)
IFFHS South American Player of the 20th Century (10th place)
Brazilian Football Museum Hall of Fame

Records 
 South American Championship / Copa América all-time top goalscorer: 17 goals (shared with Norberto Méndez)

References

External links
 
 Profile at cbf.com.br
 Craque Imortal 

1922 births
2002 deaths
People from São Gonçalo, Rio de Janeiro
Brazilian footballers
Brazilian football managers
1949 South American Championship players
1950 FIFA World Cup players
Copa América-winning players
Chilean Primera División players
Expatriate footballers in Chile
Campeonato Brasileiro Série A players
Campeonato Brasileiro Série A managers
Brazil international footballers
CR Flamengo footballers
Bangu Atlético Clube players
São Paulo FC players
Uberaba Sport Club players
Audax Italiano footballers
Bangu Atlético Clube managers
CR Vasco da Gama managers
Association football forwards
Sportspeople from Rio de Janeiro (state)